William Byam Martin (1746–1806) was an English merchant and official of the East India Company.

Early life
William was the son of Samuel Martin (1694–1776), a slave owner in Antigua. Samuel Martin (Secretary to the Treasury) (1714–1788), Secretary to the Treasury was his half-brother, and he had to other brothers, Sir Henry Martin, 1st Baronet (1733–1794), for many years naval commissioner at Portsmouth and Comptroller of the Navy, and Josiah Martin (1737–1786), Governor of North Carolina from 1771.

He was Resident for Murshidabad, resigning in January 1780.

References

1746 births
1806 deaths
British East India Company civil servants
English merchants